Toni Karjalainen (born 9 July 1979) is a Finnish professional golfer who formerly played on the European Tour and the Challenge Tour. He was his country's highest ranked male golfer and one of only a few Finnish golfers playing on the leading professional tours when he won twice on the Challenge Tour in 2005 and 2006.

Amateur career
As an amateur, Karjalainen represented his country at the European Youths' Team Championship, the European Amateur Team Championship and twice at the Eisenhower Trophy. At the 2001 European Amateur Team Championship at Ljunghusen Golf Club in Sweden, team Finland finished a historical high forth (behind England, Ireland and Sweden) in the qualifying stroke-play competition and lost to champions to be Scotland in the quarter-finals.

In June 2002, still an amateur, Karjalainen won the Messilä Trophy in Finland on the Nordic Golf League.

Professional career
Karjalainen earned his playing rights on the 2004 Nordic Golf League by finished second at the qualifying school at Eslöv Golf Club in Sweden at the end of 2003.

Karjalainen won the 2005 Thomas Bjørn Open in Denmark in his first season on the Challenge Tour, the European Tour's official developmental tour, on his way to finish 20th on the Order of Merit, the last place to earn full membership, with limited privileges, on the European Tour for 2006. He followed that up in 2006 by winning again on the Challenge Tour, the Telenet Trophy at the Limburg Golf and Country Club in Belgium in a last round interrupted by thunderstorms. He also made several appearances on the main European Tour in 2006, making five cuts. His best finish on the European Tour was tied 20th at the 2006 BA-CA Golf Open in Vienna, Austria.

In July 2006 he reached a career best 282nd on the Official World Golf Ranking, and was at the time Finland's highest ranked player.

Having lost his playing privileges in Europe at the end of the 2008 season, Karjalainen joined the Asian Tour in 2009 after coming through qualifying school.

Professional wins (6)

Challenge Tour wins (2)

Nordic Golf League wins (3)

Finnish Tour wins (1)

Team appearances
Amateur
European Youths' Team Championship (representing Finland): 1998, 2000
Eisenhower Trophy (representing Finland): 2000, 2002
European Amateur Team Championship (representing Finland): 2001

See also
2005 Challenge Tour graduates

References

External links

Finnish male golfers
European Tour golfers
Asian Tour golfers
Sportspeople from South Karelia
People from Lappeenranta
1979 births
Living people
21st-century Finnish people